Prass is a surname. Notable people with the surname include:

 Aleksander Prass (1891–1932), Estonian politician
 Alexander Prass (born 2001), Austrian footballer
 Brigitte Prass (born 1963), Romanian swimmer
 Fernando Prass (born 1978), Brazilian footballer
 Natalie Prass (born 1986), American singer-songwriter